José Antonio Franco may refer to:
 José Antonio Franco (footballer, born 1979)
 José Antonio Franco (footballer, born 1998)